The M1918 helmet (also known as M18) is a steel military combat helmet used by Switzerland from its introduction in 1918 to its replacement by the M1971. In 1943 improvements would be made to the design to which it would be called the M1918/40. The helmet would be seen used by Swiss servicemen until the late 20th century.

Design

The design was drawn up by Dr. Edward A. Gessler and Paul Boesh, director of the Swiss National Museum and sculptor in the Swiss General staff as a Lieutenant, respectively.

The shape drawing from the German M16 Stahlhelm and sometimes being confused with the coincidentally developed experimental combat helmet Model 5 by the United States sharing the near-same general shape and liner design. The shell being made from 1.15 mm manganese steel and painted in a drab green with the liner being similar to the M16 Stahlhelm's M17 liner with its three pads and clamp and hook chin strap attaching directly to the liner. The liner being attached to the shell not by rivets but by clamps keeping it in place, the shell having two ventilation holes towards the rear.

In 1940 a version of the M18 was made but with a shallower skirt and in 1943 most M18s and M18/40s were given a coat of matte black paint mixed with sawdust for a textured finish, as well as a new liner that only went around three-quarters of the circumference of the inside of the shell designated M18/43. New production helmets after this year having more shallow side skirts to its former model. The M1931 camouflage covers for the helmet were introduced in 1943; reversible from one of two patterns depending on the conditions. A second type of camouflage cover was adopted in 1956 featuring a variant of the Swiss TAZ 57 pattern. The earlier M18 was exported to Argentina in the late 1930s and issued - as the M1938 - as its first combat steel helmet. It was also used as a civil defense helmet painted a fluorescent yellow.

Around 603,000 units of all models would be produced throughout its career.

References

External links

Combat helmets of Switzerland